Symphony No. 1 is the 14th studio album by Joe Jackson, released in 1999. Jackson received a Grammy for Best Pop Instrumental Album in 2001, after several unsuccessful nominations for previous work. Symphony No. 1 was played by a band of jazz and rock musicians including Steve Vai and Terence Blanchard.

Track listing
All tracks were written, arranged and produced by Joe Jackson.

Personnel 
 Musicians
 Joe Jackson – piano, keyboards
 Wessell Anderson – alto saxophone
 Terence Blanchard – trumpet
 Gary Burke – drums
 Robin Eubanks – trombone
 Mat Fieldes – electric bass, acoustic bass guitar
 Sue Hadjopoulos – percussion
 Mary Rowell – violin, electric violin, viola
 Steve Vai – electric guitar

 Production
 Joe Jackson - arrangements, producer, sampling, sequencing
 Dan Gellert - associate producer, recording engineer, mixing engineer
 Sheldon Steiger - associate producer
 Anthony Ruotolo - assistant recording engineer
 Ted Jensen - mastering engineer

Charts

References

External links 
 Symphony No. 1 album information at The Joe Jackson Archive

1999 albums
Joe Jackson (musician) albums
Grammy Award for Best Contemporary Instrumental Album